Redona, is a quarter of the Italian city of Bergamo in Lombardy.  Until 1927, when it was annexed to the city, Redona was an independent municipality (Italian: comune). The higher elevations of land in Redona, on the shoulder of the Maresana hill, are covered with chestnut trees. Redona, which had a population of approximately 5000 in 2007, borders the municipalities of Torre Boldone and Gorle.

Notes 

Quarters of Bergamo
Former municipalities of Lombardy